Kiskrajcár is a 1953 Hungarian comedy film directed by Márton Keleti. It was entered into the 1954 Cannes Film Festival.

Cast
 Ági Mészáros - Garas Juli
 Ádám Szirtes - Orbán
 Erzsi Pápai - Anna (as Pápay Erzsi)
 Imre Soós - Madaras Jóska
 Ferenc Bessenyei - Turi
 Sándor Tompa - Szöllõsi
 Zsuzsa Simon - Tiszai Edit
 Manyi Kiss - Zámbóné
 Márta Fónay - Gulyásné
 Imre Pongrácz - Balogh
 Ferenc Kállai - Miskei (as Kállay Ferenc)
 Andor Ajtay - Mikola
 Vera Sennyei - Rauf Kornélia

References

External links

1953 films
1953 comedy films
Hungarian comedy films
1950s Hungarian-language films
Films directed by Márton Keleti